The Journal of Instrumentation is an online peer-reviewed scientific journal. It is published by IOP Publishing on behalf of the International School for Advanced Studies.

The journal covers concept and instrumentation in topic areas related to, and including detector and accelerator science, including related theory, simulations, modelling, and experimental methods.

Abstracting and indexing 
The journal is abstracted and indexed in:
 Scopus
 Inspec
 Chemical Abstracts Service
 INIS Atomindex
 NASA Astrophysics Data System
 Science Citation Index
 Materials Science Citation Index
According to the Journal Citation Reports, the journal has a 2020 impact factor of 1.415.

Notable articles 
The journal publishes the complete scientific documentation of the CERN Large Hadron Collider machine and detectors. These papers are published as open access. It also publishes the technical reports concerning the Planck Low Frequency Instrument on board the European Space Agency's Planck satellite, which was launched in May 2009, and the three-volume technical report of the Deep Underground Neutrino Experiment (DUNE). These papers are also published as open access.

References

External links 

English-language journals
IOP Publishing academic journals
Monthly journals
Physics journals
Publications established in 2006